Stefan Dübel (born January 13, 1960 in Hanau, Hesse) is a German biologist. Since October 2002, he has been a full professor at the University of Braunschweig and head of the Biotechnology Department of the Institute of Biochemistry, Biotechnology and Bioinformatics. His work is centred around protein engineering, phage display and recombinant antibodies.

Biography
Dübel studied biology at the Johannes Gutenberg University in Mainz and at the Ruprecht-Karls University in Heidelberg from 1978 to 1983. He subsequently completed his civil service. From 1986 to 1989 he was promoted Dr. rer. nat. with a thesis titled: Cell Cycle Regulation and Cell Differentiation in the Coelenterate Hydra at the Centre for Molecular Biology at the University of Heidelberg. Subsequently, he was a postdoctoral fellow at the German Cancer Research Center and at the Institute of Cell Biology and Immunology at the University of Stuttgart. From 1996 to 2001 he was group leader at the Department of Molecular Genetics at the University of Heidelberg, where he achieved his habilitation in the lab of Ekkehard Bautz in 1997. From 2001 to 2002 he was CSO of LifeBits AG.

Scientific work
Dübel's most important work was, together with Frank Breitling, his contributions to the development of phage display for the production of human antibodies. He co-pioneered in vitro antibody selection technologies, resulting in several inventions including antibody phage display, human antibody libraries ) and antibody libraries with randomised CDRs. His lab continued to contribute multiple innovations to Recombinant antibodies, therapeutic antibodies, phage display, ORFeome display, animal-free antibody generation and in vitro evolution, e.g. Hyperphage technology (2001), ORFeome display (2006), and targeted RNases for cancer therapy (1995/2008). Further achievements include the development of the world's first protein knock down mouse using intrabodies (2014), a universal allosteric switch module for antibody affinity (2017) and multiclonal antibodies (2019). In 2020, he was one of the initiators of CORAT (Corona Antibody Team) which aims to cure COVID-19 with neutralizing antibodies against SARS-CoV-2.

Awards and honours

 2015 Innovation in Biotechnology Award of the American Association of Pharmaceutical Scientists
 2016 Technology Transfer Prize of the IHK Braunschweig
 2019 Innovation Award of the German BioRegions for the tick vaccine
 2020 Two Innovation Awards of the State of Lower Saxony for Abcalis and Corat 
 2022 ECEAE Prize for animal-free antibodies

Bibliography
 
 
 
 

These are the top 5 most cited papers authored or co-author by Dübel:

References

External links 
 
 

Living people
Academic staff of the Technical University of Braunschweig
1960 births
People from Hanau
Johannes Gutenberg University Mainz alumni
Heidelberg University alumni
University of Stuttgart alumni
20th-century German biologists
21st-century German biologists